Lilias Torrance Newton  LL. D. (November 3, 1896 – January 10, 1980) was a Canadian painter and a member of the Beaver Hall Group. She was one of the more important portrait artists in Canada in the twentieth century.

Early life and education
Newton was born in Lachine, Quebec, a suburb of Montreal. Her parents, Alice Mary Stewart and Forbes Torrance, were prominent Montreal figures; her father being a member of the Pen and Pencil Club of Montreal.
An old sketchbook of her father's is thought to be her early artistic inspiration. She studied at Miss Edgar's and Miss Cramp's School, where she was taught by Laura Muntz Lyall. She left school at 16 to attend classes given by William Brymner at the Art Association of Montreal, where she won a scholarship in the Life class in her first year. She later studied with Alfred Wolmark in London and Alexandre Jacovleff in Paris.

Career 
During the First World War, she worked for the Red Cross in England. In 1922, she won an Honorable Mention at the Paris Salon while studying with Alfred Wolmark.
She was a founding member of the Beaver Hall Group and of the Canadian Group of Painters.

In 1933, at the first show of the Canadian Group of Painters, Newton's Nude in the Studio was removed from the exhibition by the board of the Art Gallery of Toronto (AGO), because it felt that the public would find it shocking since the model wore green, high-heeled shoes. These were taken as evidence that she was too naked to be a nude. The painting was bought by Alice and the Rt. Honourable Vincent Massey, Toronto and Port Hope, Ontario, and in time came to the Thomson collection at the AGO. In an interview, Newton said how pleased she was about the rumpus over the painting because it brought her attention. As she said, "everybody I ever knew wanted to come and have a look at it!"

Newton is best known for her portraits, over 300 in her career, including her 1957 portraits of Queen Elizabeth II and Prince Philip. Newton was the first known Canadian commissioned to make a portrait of either subject. Her portraits are said to suggest the psychology of the subject. Like Edwin Holgate, she shows a concern for solid structure derived from Cézanne in her work.
Her work is in the collections of the National Gallery of Canada, the Art Gallery of Alberta, the Glenbow Museum, the Art Gallery of Ontario, Hart House at the University of Toronto, the Montreal Museum of Fine Arts, the Musée national des beaux-arts du Québec, the Canadian War Museum, and other public institutions in Canada.

Newton was elected an Associate of the Royal Canadian Academy in 1923, and became its third female member in 1937. She became an Academician in 1939 and 1973. She also was a member of the Canadian Group of Painters. She taught at her alma mater, the Art Association of Montreal, and received an honorary LL.D. from the University of Toronto.

Personal life 
In 1921, she married Frederick G. Newton, and had a child. She was divorced in 1933. 
Newton continued to paint until 1975, when she fell and broke her collarbone. Lilias Torrance Newton died at the age of 83 in Cowansville, Quebec in 1980.

References

External links
 National Gallery of Canada - Lilias Torrance Newton
 National Gallery of Canada - Lilias Torrance Newton Paintings
Lilias Torrance Newton fonds at the National Gallery of Canada, Ottawa, Ontario

1896 births
1980 deaths
20th-century Canadian painters
20th-century Canadian women artists
People from Lachine, Quebec
Members of the Royal Canadian Academy of Arts
Canadian women in World War I
Artists from Montreal
Canadian women painters